Me TV (and its variations) is a branding used for the following television entities:

 MeTV (Memorable Entertainment Television) a broadcast television network owned by Weigel Broadcasting
 ME:TV, a former weekday programming block on Nickelodeon, replaced by TEENick
 Me (South African TV channel)
 ME, the former name of the Italian shopping and movie TV channel previously called "for you"
 Middle East Television, a Middle Eastern family channel owned by LeSEA Broadcasting, which uses the METV acronym
 Music & Entertainment Television, an Austin, Texas cable music channel that also uses the ME TV acronym
 Me TV, a digital television viewer for GNOME
 MeTV, a fictional television network in the Grand Theft Auto universe, parodying MTV
 Mētele, a television station broadcasting on channel 6 (digital) in Nagoya, Japan

See also 
 MyTV (disambiguation)